Acacia sciophanes, commonly known as the Ghost wattle or Wundowlin wattle, is a shrub of the genus Acacia and the subgenus Plurinerves that is endemic to a small area in south western Australia. In 1995 it was declared as rare in 1995 according to the Western Australian Wildlife Conservation Act 1950 and is listed as endangered under the Environment Protection and Biodiversity Conservation Act 1999.

Description
Like most species of Acacia it has phyllodes rather than true leaves. It blooms from September to November and produces yellow flowers. The simple inflorescences occur singly or in pairs in the axils and have spherical flower-heads with a diameter of  containing 25 to 31 sub-densely packed bright golden coloured flowers. The firmly chartaceous, hairy and cylindrical seed pods that form after flowering  are linear but slightly raised over and constricted between each of the seeds.

Taxonomy
The species was first formally described by the botanist Bruce Maslin as a part of the work Studies in the genus Acacia (Mimosaceae) - Miscellany as published in the journal Nuytsia. It was reclassified in 2003 by Leslie Pedley as Racosperma sciophanes then transferred back to genus Acacia in 2005.
It is closely related to Acacia anfractuosa and resembles Acacia merinthophora.

Distribution
It is native to a small area in the Wheatbelt region of Western Australia. It grows in gravelly sandy that overlies laterite as a part of shrubland communities dominated by Acacia neurophylla, Acacia merrickiae, Allocasuarina corniculata  Allocasuarina campestris and with hummock grassland species. The species is represented by two main populations or seven subpopulations with a total of 484 separate plants.

See also
List of Acacia species

References

sciophanes
Acacias of Western Australia
Plants described in 1977
Taxa named by Bruce Maslin